The Vatican Decrees in their Bearing on Civil Allegiance is an anti-Catholic pamphlet written by British politician William Ewart Gladstone in November 1874.

Outrage about papal infallibility
Gladstone was outraged at the Vatican Council's decree of papal infallibility and set about to refute it. The pamphlet sold 150,000 copies by the end of 1874.

Church and State
Gladstone claimed that the decree had placed British Catholics in a dilemma over their loyalty to the Crown and their loyalty to the Pope. He urged British Catholics to reject papal infallibility as they had opposed the Spanish Armada of 1588.

Rule of law against despotism
He described the Catholic Church as "an Asian monarchy: nothing but one giddy height of despotism, and one dead level of religious subservience". He further claimed that the Pope wanted to destroy the rule of law and replace it with arbitrary tyranny and then to hide these "crimes against liberty beneath a suffocating cloud of incense".

Later pamphlet in 1875
In February 1875, Gladstone published a second anti-Catholic pamphlet, which was a defence of his earlier pamphlet and a reply to his critics, Vaticanism: an Answer to Reproofs and Replies.

Responses from Catholics

Letter to the Duke of Norfolk
John Henry Newman's Letter to the Duke of Norfolk was meant as a response to Gladstone's claim that Catholics have no mental freedom.

Immortale Dei
Immortale Dei is an 1885 encyclical of Pope Leo XIII on church-state relations, specifically on the topic of civil allegiance, which is defined as a duty of loyalty and obedience which a person owes to the state of which he is a citizen.

References

1874 books
First Vatican Council
Anti-Catholic publications
William Ewart Gladstone
1874 in the United Kingdom